Arch Bridge may refer to:

An arch bridge
Arch Bridge (Bristol, Maine), listed on the National Register of Historic Places
Arch Bridge (Bellows Falls), Vermont and New Hampshire
Oregon City Bridge, alternatively known as the Arch Bridge

See also
Fuling Arch Bridge
Godavari Arch Bridge
Hayden Arch Bridge
Hulme Arch Bridge
Humber Bay Arch Bridge
Stone Arch Bridge (disambiguation)